Khujli is a 2017 Indian short drama film written & directed by Sonam Nair, produced by Chintan Ruparel & Anuj Gosalia and starring Jackie Shroff and Neena Gupta. It was released on 31 March 2017 by Terribly Tiny Talkies to their official YouTube handle. The film marks debut of Jackie Shroff in short films.

Plot
In a room, a bed is shaking rhythmically and sounds of a man moaning as it is revealed that it was due to Roopmati (Neena Gupta) is scratching Girdharilal's (Jackie Shroff) back with a churning stick to ease an itch. Their [son] knocks on the door and asks them to be quit. He further informs them that he will be out late. Girdharilal replies humorously that instead of telling so [he] could have texted them. In the kitchen, Roopmati ignites the gas stove as her aged grandmother is walking towards washroom behind her. The twist in the plot comes when Jackie finds a pair of pink handcuffs in his young son's bedroom. Scandalised and angry, he shows his find to his wife. His tirade however, is interrupted when Neena smiles slyly and tells him she knows the handcuffs are used for BDSM, because she had read Fifty Shades of Grey.

Cast
Jackie Shroff as Girdharilal
Neena Gupta as Roopmati
Rani Patwar as grandma
Archak Chhabra as son of Girdharilal and Roopmati

Soundtrack
The film's background score is composed by Somesh Saha and it features vocals by singer Garima Yagnik.

Awards
Jackie Shroff won Best Actor Male Award at Filmfare Awards 2018 for his role in the film.

References

External links

2017 short films
Indian short films
Indian drama films
2010s Hindi-language films
2017 drama films
Hindi-language drama films